Vermont Route 102 (VT 102) is a north–south state highway in Essex County, Vermont, in the United States. It follows the west bank of the Connecticut River and parallels U.S. Route 3 (US 3), which is routed along the river's east bank in New Hampshire. The southern terminus of the route is at US 2 in Guildhall. Its northern terminus is at VT 114 and VT 253 in Canaan.

Route description
VT 102 begins at an intersection with US 2 on the west bank of the Connecticut River in Guildhall. US 2 heads east across the river into Lancaster, New Hampshire; however, VT 102 heads north along the waterway's western bank. It heads northwest into the village of Guildhall, then veers due east to access Guildhall Road, a local highway connecting VT 102 to US 3 across the river in Northumberland, New Hampshire. VT 102 turns northward at this junction, mirroring the curves in the routing of the Connecticut River.

The highway continues several miles to the north to the town of Maidstone, where another local river crossing, Lamoreaux Road, runs eastward to US 3 in the New Hampshire town of Stratford. VT 102 continues northward for several more miles into the town of Bloomfield, where it meets VT 105. VT 105 westbound traverses the northern part of the state towards the cities of Newport and St. Albans, while VT 105 eastbound ends at the river crossing to North Stratford, New Hampshire, and continues as an unnumbered road to US 3.

After the intersection with VT 105, VT 102 turns to the northeast, continuing to parallel the western riverbank to Lemington. It is north of town where VT 102 meets the shortest signed route in the state, VT 26. VT 102 turns back to the north and continues into the town of Canaan, where it comes to an end at an intersection with VT 114 and VT 253. VT 253, meanwhile, is a northward continuation of VT 102 along the riverbank to the Canadian border.

Major intersections

References

External links

102
Transportation in Essex County, Vermont